West Torrens Football Club was an Australian rules football club that competed in the South Australian National Football League (SANFL) from 1897 to 1990. In 1991, the club merged with neighbouring Woodville Football Club to form the Woodville-West Torrens Eagles.

With the proposed introduction of representative Districts for clubs in the SAFA the Native Club in 1896 derived its name from Electoral district of West Torrens and based itself in the western suburbs of Adelaide, around the western reaches of the River Torrens.

Club history

A precursor club in the district was the West Adelaide Football Club (1878–1887) that was founded in 1878 as the West Torrens and dissolved after just one season in the SAFA after changing its name to West Adelaide and wearing colours of Red, White and Blue in 1887.

The modern club was formed originally as "The Natives" and competed in the 1895 SAFA season and  1896 SAFA season wearing Blue with a gold Hoop. Its initial meetings were held at the President's Office at Grenfell Street in Adelaide.  With the introduction of Electoral Districts at a meeting of the SAFA on Monday 26th Oct 1896 at Prince Alfred Hotel the "Port" Natives delegates informed the SAFA that they intend to rename themselves West Torrens. At the Annual General Meeting held on Friday 19 March 1897 at Lady Daly Hotel, Hindmarsh it was passed unanimously that the Club would alter the name from The Natives Football Club to West Torrens Football Club.

In its history of almost 100 years, West Torrens won only four premierships; conversely, however, they only slumped to the wooden spoon on six occasions, evidence that they were generally quite competitive.

Despite their relative lack of team success, winning only four SANFL Premierships and one Night Premiership in their history (1924, 1933, 1945, 1953 and 1983 (night)), West Torrens boasted some of the best individual players ever to play Australian rules football. Players such as 1946 and 1947 Magarey Medallist, 1953 All-Australian and 1953 premiership captain Bob Hank, triple Magarey Medal winner (1955, 1958 & 1963), 1956 All-Australian and '53 premiership player Lindsay Head and former Australian Test cricketer Neil Hawke were all star players for the club.

The club reached the finals for the last time in 1980 and by 1982 there were calls for West Torrens to merge with another club. In 1990, with the imminent entry of the South Australian-based Adelaide Crows into the national Australian Football League (AFL), it was decided that West Torrens and Woodville would amalgamate. In an apt moment, Woodville and West Torrens were drawn to play each other in their respective final games which was played at the Adelaide Oval. The two sides merged after the completion of the 1990 SANFL season and have since participated in the SANFL as the Woodville-West Torrens Eagles.

Awards
Premierships 4 (1924, 1933, 1945 & 1953)
 West Torrens won an unofficial premiership in 1918 while the SANFL was officially disbanded for the duration of World War I.
 During World War II, West Torrens merged with Port Adelaide Football Club and won the 1942 premiership.
Minor premierships 2 (1924, 1963)
Wooden Spoons 6 (1895 1st Season as Natives, 1930, 1941, 1975, 1976, 1986)
SANFL Night premierships: 1 - 1983
SANFL Reserves premierships: 17 - 1919, 1920, 1922, 1924, 1926, 1927, 1931, 1935, 1941, 1946, 1950, 1953, 1954, 1962, 1968, 1984, 1990
SANFL Under 19's premierships: 9 - 1936, 1938, 1939, 1941, 1955, 1956, 1957, 1973, 1989
SANFL Under 17's premierships: 3 - 1953, 1954, 1957
* 1983 SANFL Escort Cup Grand Final played at West Torrens home ground Thebarton Oval. The Eagles defeated South Adelaide in the last SANFL Night Grand Final to be played at a suburban ground.

Magarey Medallists
Tom MacKenzie (1902) 
Dave Low (1912)
John Karney (1921)*
Max Pontifex (1932)
Bob Hank (1946 & 1947)
Lindsay Head (1955, 1958 & 1963)
* In 1998 John Karney, along with Charlie Adams (Port Adelaide) and Wat Scott (Norwood) was retrospectively awarded the 1921 Magarey Medal after he was originally in a four way tie with only South Adelaide's 1919 and 1920 Medal winner Dan Moriarty awarded the 1921 Medal.

SANFL leading goalkickers
John Willis: 85 goals (1952)
Geoff Kingston: 78 goals (1961)

Club colours and emblems
Blue and Gold (1895–1990)

 West Torrens was known as the Eagles from the early 1950s until their merging with Woodville.

Home grounds
Jubilee Oval (1897–1904)
Hindmarsh Oval (1905–21)
Thebarton Oval (1922–89)
Football Park (1990)

Famous players
Bob Hank: The dual Magarey Medallist captained West Torrens for nine seasons and was Club Best & Fairest a record nine times. He was inducted into the Australian Football Hall of Fame in 1999.
Neil Hawke: The Test cricketer was also a star player with West Torrens following his clearance from Port Adelaide
Lindsay Head: The three time Magarey Medallist is also club game record holder with 327 games. He was inducted into the Australian Football Hall of Fame in 1996.
Bruce Lindsay: Captained West Torrens for seven seasons. At 29 was a member of the inaugural Adelaide Crows squad for the 1991 AFL season.
Michael Long: Won West Torrens Best & Fairest in 1988. Won Norm Smith Medal as best on ground playing for Essendon in their 1993 AFL Grand Final win over Carlton. Of Aboriginal descent, Long has become a spokesman for Indigenous Australians and was inducted into the Australian Football Hall of Fame in 2007.
Bob Shearman: Went on to captain the Sturt Football Club and play in several of their premiership sides. Challenge trophy between Sturt and Woodville-West Torrens Eagles is named after him.
Neville Roberts: aka "Rocky" Roberts who wore a protective skull cap after an injury, before transferring to Norwood
Kym Dillon: Also a breakfast radio announcer and Sports reporter/announcer for Channel 9 Adelaide.
Steven Stretch: One of many SANFL players who were recruited into the VFL in the 1980s, playing for Melbourne and Fitzroy.
Matthew Rendell: A 200 cm / 102 kg ruckman who played 79 games for West Torrens before playing 164 games for the Fitzroy Football Club in the VFL and winning two best and fairests in 1982/83. He played a further 13 games for the Brisbane Bears before retiring in 1992. Matthew's two brothers Tim and Steven also played for West Torrens.
Peter Kelly: A former captain who played over 150 games for the Eagles during the 1970s.

Club records
South Australian Premiers: 4 - 1924, 1933, 1945, 1953
SANFL Night Premiers (Escort Cup): 1 - 1983
Record Attendance at Thebarton Oval: 20,832 v Norwood in 1962
Record Attendance: 48,755 v Norwood at Adelaide Oval, 1948 SANFL Grand Final
Most Games: 327 by Lindsay Head (1952–70)
Most Goals in a Season: 85 by John Willis in 1952
Highest Score: 34.15 (219) v South Adelaide at Adelaide Oval, Round 14, 1950
Magarey Medallists: Tom MacKenzie (1902), Dave Low (1912), John Karney (1921), Max Pontifex (1932), Bob Hank (1946 & 1947), Lindsay Head (1955, 1958 & 1963)
All-Australians: Bob Hank (1953), Lindsay Head (1956), Geoff Kingston (1961), Bob Shearman (1961)

References

External links

Full Points Footy History of West Torrens Football Club
Talking Footy South Australia

Former South Australian National Football League clubs
Australian rules football clubs in South Australia
1894 establishments in Australia
1990 disestablishments in Australia
Australian rules football clubs established in 1894
Australian rules football clubs disestablished in 1990